House Hazards is a television series produced by Cineflix that premiered on HGTV Canada on October 16, 2012. The show is co-hosted by Francesca Garigue, Dan Dicaire and Brendan Callaghan. Each episode of House Hazards looks at an everyday household danger. The hosts use state of the art technology and scientific experiments to explore the sometimes disastrous results of human error or general wear on a house.

Hosts
Brendan Callaghan:
Toronto-based special-effects guru Brendan Callaghan is one of the co-hosts of House Hazards. As a former bartender, Brendan transitioned into a TV art department gig in 1996, but stepped in front of the camera for the first time as the co-host of Prank Science. He has also worked as a special-effects technition for This Is Howie Do It, before becoming a co-host on House Hazards.

Francesca Garigue:
Francesca Garigue is an animal biologist and a former runway model. With degrees in biology and psychology from Carleton University in Ottawa, Francesca served as the Program Manager of the Science Alberta Foundation, helping to promote science and technology in schools and on social media. She also conducted fieldwork in Namibia at a wildcat rehabilitation centre.

Dan Dicaire:
While pursuing chemical engineering degrees from the University of Ottawa, Dan Dicaire's research on solar heat was presented at conferences around the world. Dan is currently an Energy Efficiency and Sustainability Officer at Ottawa Community Housing Corporation. He was also a contestant in the first season of Canada'a Greatest Know-It-All.

Episodes

Season 1

Episode 1001 "Cleanliness"
Everyone likes a clean house, but there are dirty secrets when it comes to domestic disinfection. Brendan maxes out a laundry machine to simulate a common mishap while Dan faces extreme heat as he disables a dryer. Francesca and Dan wonder if the dirtiest room in the house is the bathroom or the kitchen. And Brendan's experiment with everyday household cleaners produces a not-so-spotless finish!

Episode 2 "Freak Accidents"
The House Hazards team expose the explosive science behind potential domestic disasters. To test the real-life phenomenon of bursting toilets due to methane gas build-up, Brendan creates this bathroom experiment by stuffing manure, food scraps, and diapers into a septic tank. To prove the common dangers of cooking, Francesca rigs up a grease fire that really blazes. Meanwhile, engineer Dan demonstrates the danger of pressurized cylinders commonly used at birthday parties.

Episode 1003 "Home Entertainment"

From ear shattering stereos to airborne air mattresses, a red-hot pool party becomes a backyard blowout bash when the House Hazards experts scientifically explore the less inviting aspects of home entertainment.

Episode 1004 "Reckless Abandon"

From second storey plunges to hair-raising soaks in the tub, crash test dummies get a serious workout as the House Hazards experts dig deeper into the scary science behind hidden household harms.

Episode 1005 "Security Overload"

From not-so-safe rooms to boundary-violating fences, the House Hazards team sounds the alarm on things designed to protect your home. And the results will have viewers hitting the panic button, not the panic room!

Episode 1006 "Natural Disasters"

From lethal landscaping to a very windy game of dodge ball, the House Hazards team of domestic scientists investigates if home is where the heart should be when Mother Nature comes calling.

Episode 1007 "Infestation"

From buggy insect zappers to hare-triggered house fires, the House Hazards team discovers what happens when pest control goes horribly wrong.

Episode 1008 "Holiday Horror"

From well-lit trees to a hot date night gone wrong, the temperature rises inside the House Hazards test home when the potential dangers of daily life are scientifically discovered. Dan, Brendan, and Francesca take the heat so homeowners can avoid a domestic meltdown.

Episode 1009 "Dinner Party Disaster"

From 5-alarm chili to all-purpose flour power, the House Hazards domestic scientists get cooking to separate the facts from kitchen fiction when it comes to potential culinary dangers.

Episode 1010 "Collapse and Expand"

From an unexpected bath in the bedroom to a kitchen counter blender bender, the House Hazards domestic scientists shed light on the potential dangers lurking in everyone's home.

Episode 1011 "Car Through House"

An uninvited guest crashes their dinner party and the grass is definitely not greener when the wheels of potential domestic disaster are set in motion by the House Hazards team of scientists.

Episode 1012 "Load-bearing Wall"

The walls come tumbling down and the furniture reaches a tipping point when the House Hazards experts discover how home renovations can quickly turn into home demos when left to not-so-handy-men.

Episode 1013 "Braving the Elements"

From hailstorms to flash floods, the House Hazards team of experts simulate a series of natural disasters. But their test home gets snowed under in the process proving there can never be enough weatherproofing.

Episode 1014 "Jack of All Trades"

The House Hazards domestic scientists put a buzz kill on the handiness of table saws. But it's their research on the hidden dangers of water heaters that really get them into hot water.

See also
 Never Ever Do This At Home, a television series with the same theme aired on Discovery.
 :de:Nicht nachmachen!, a television series with the same theme aired on Discovery (Germany)
 Achtung! - Die Exprimenten-Show, a television series with the same theme aired on Discovery (Switzerland)

References

External links
 https://web.archive.org/web/20130103123534/http://www.hgtv.ca/househazards/
 http://www.cineflixrights.com/sections/19-Programming/shows/house-hazards

2010s Canadian reality television series
2012 Canadian television series debuts
HGTV (Canada) original programming